Tom Loren Burleson (born February 24, 1952) is an American former professional basketball player.  A 7′2″ center, Burleson played for North Carolina State University's 1974 NCAA national championship team.

Early life 
Burleson is a native of Avery County, North Carolina. He was an All-American at Newland High School and Avery County High School, as well as North Carolina State University.

College 
As a collegian, Burleson teamed with All-American David Thompson, guard Monte Towe and forward Tim Stoddard (who would go on to have success as a Major League Baseball pitcher) to dethrone UCLA and win the 1974 NCAA Championship.  Burleson was the MVP of the 1973 and 1974 ACC Tournaments and was All-Final Four in 1974.  Burleson's defense of UCLA superstar Bill Walton was key to the Wolfpack's semifinal win. He was a member of the 1973 World University Games Gold Medal basketball team.

Burleson wanted to be listed at his actual height but the coaching staff said he would officially be the tallest player in American basketball and it would bring a lot of good exposure to him and the school. The ploy worked and Burleson was featured on the cover of Sports Illustrated in 1974.

Olympic team 
During the 1972 Olympics held in Munich, Burleson unwittingly walked into a parking lot where the Israeli hostages were brought before they were removed by helicopter from the Olympic village and later massacred. Burleson was held at gunpoint against a wall by one of the terrorists, and told not to move or look at the hostages as they came through the parking lot. He is the last athlete who had any contact with the Israeli Olympians 45 minutes before they died.

Burleson was also a member of the 1972 U.S. Olympic Basketball Team that lost a controversial gold medal game to the Soviet Union. The entire 1972 Olympic Basketball team believed they had been cheated and voted unanimously to not accept the silver.

Pro career 
Before the 1974 NBA draft, it appeared almost certain that Burleson would be taken by the Phoenix Suns. But because Seattle traded Dick Snyder to the Cleveland Cavaliers at the last minute, the Sonics gained the right to pick before the Suns, so the two teams vied for a contract with Burleson. After considering both offers, Burleson chose Seattle.

Drafted by the Seattle SuperSonics as the third overall player in the 1974 NBA Draft, Burleson entered the league tied with Artis Gilmore and Kareem Abdul-Jabbar as the tallest active NBA player at 7 feet 2 inches. He was named to the 1974–75 NBA All-Rookie Team. Playing under coach Bill Russell, Burleson recorded strong playoff performances in both 1974-75 and 1975-76 for Seattle. For his playoff career, Burleson averaged 20.7 points, 10.2 rebounds, and 1.7 blocks per game in 15 career playoff games. His second season as a professional proved to be his best, as he averaged 15.6 points, 9.0 rebounds, and 1.8 blocks per game. Just as he began to come into his own in the NBA, he was injured breaking up a fight between his teammate and an opposing team member. The injury was instrumental in his steady decline over the next several years.

Burleson was known throughout his amateur and pro career as a good shot blocker. He played seven seasons in the NBA with Seattle, the Kansas City Kings and the Atlanta Hawks.

Personal life 
He  lives in Avery County, North Carolina with his wife Denise. They have three sons: Robert, David, and Quentin. He is an avid supporter of North Carolina State University. He has served for several years as a Special Ambassador to the Grandfather Mountain Highland Games.

Honors 
In 2002, Burleson was named to the ACC 50th Anniversary men's basketball team honoring the fifty greatest players in Atlantic Coast Conference history.

Basketball camp 
In 1983 Burleson founded the Tommy Burleson Basketball Camp, which is held in collaboration with the Avery County Parks and Recreation Department in North Carolina.

References

External links 
 

1952 births
Living people
All-American college men's basketball players
American men's basketball players
Atlanta Hawks players
Basketball players at the 1972 Summer Olympics
Basketball players from North Carolina
Centers (basketball)
Kansas City Kings players
Medalists at the 1972 Summer Olympics
NC State Wolfpack men's basketball players
Olympic silver medalists for the United States in basketball
Parade High School All-Americans (boys' basketball)
People from Avery County, North Carolina
Seattle SuperSonics draft picks
Seattle SuperSonics players
United States men's national basketball team players